The white-throated flycatcher (Empidonax albigularis) is a species of bird in the family Tyrannidae. It is found in Belize, Costa Rica, El Salvador, Guatemala, Honduras, Mexico, Nicaragua, and Panama. Its natural habitats are subtropical or tropical moist shrubland and heavily degraded former forest.

References

white-throated flycatcher
Birds of Central America
white-throated flycatcher
white-throated flycatcher
white-throated flycatcher
Taxonomy articles created by Polbot